For the song "Murder Song (5, 4, 3, 2, 1)" by Nordic indietronica singer AURORA, see All My Demons Greeting Me as a Friend.

Murder Song is a 1990 novel from Australian author Jon Cleary. It was the seventh book featuring Sydney homicide detective Scobie Malone.

Cleary originally wanted to title the book Six Green Bottles but was talked out of it by his publisher.

Synopsis
A young woman is killed by a sniper in a Sydney apartment building. Malone discovers the building was owned by a businessman with links to organised crime – who was a cadet with Malone years ago at the police academy. Soon another former classmate of theirs is also killed.

References

External links
Murder Song at AustLit (subscription required)

1990 Australian novels
Novels set in Sydney
William Collins, Sons books
William Morrow and Company books
Novels by Jon Cleary